Karl Adolf Wilhelm (1848–1933) was a German botanist and mycologist.

References

External links 

19th-century German botanists
1848 births
1933 deaths
20th-century German botanists